Cross-country skiing is a sport that has been contested at the Winter Olympic Games since the inaugural games in 1924.



Men 
The numbers in brackets denotes cross-country skiers who won gold medal in corresponding disciplines more than one time. Bold numbers denotes record number of victories in certain disciplines.

18 and 15 km 

Classic style: 1924-1936, 1948-1988, 2002-2006, 2014, 2022. Freestyle: 2010, 2018.

50 km 

Classic style: 1924-1936, 1948-1984, 1994, 2002, 2010, 2018. Freestyle: 1988-1992, 1998, 2006, 2014. Mass start: 2006-2022.

Medals:

4 × 10 km relay 

4x10 km classic style: 1936, 1948-1984. 4x10 km freestyle: 1988. 2x10 km classic style + 2x10 km freestyle: 1992-2018.

Medals:

Combined/double pursuit/Skiathlon

Medals:

Individual sprint 

Classic style: 2010, 2018. Freestyle: 2002-2006, 2014.

Team sprint 

Classic style: 2006, 2014, 2022. Free style: 2010, 2018.

Medals:

Women

10 km

Classic style: 1952-1988, 2002-2006, 2014, 2022. Freestyle: 2010, 2018.

20 and 30 km

Classic style: 1984, 1994, 2002, 2010, 2018. Freestyle: 1988-1992, 1998, 2006, 2014, 2022. Mass start: 2006-2022.

Medals:

3 × 5 km and 4 × 5 km relay 

3 × 5 km classic style: 1956-1972. 4 x 5 km classic style: 1976-1984. 4 × 5 km freestyle: 1988. 2 × 5 km classic style + 2 × 5 km freestyle: 1992-2022.

Combined/double pursuit/Skiathlon

Medals:

Individual sprint

Classic style: 2010, 2018. Freestyle: 2002-2006, 2014.

Team sprint

Classic style: 2006, 2014, 2022. Freestyle: 2010, 2018.

Medals:

Discontinued

Men's 10 km 
This event ran from 1992 to 1998 to replace the 15 km event before it was replaced again by the 15 km event for the 2002 Winter Olympics.

Classic style: 1992-1998.

Medals:

Men's 30 km 
This event ran from 1956 to 2002 and was replaced by a 30 km skiathlon (15 km classical + 15 km freestyle) for the 2006 Winter Olympics.

Classic style: 1956-1992, 1998. Freestyle: 1994, 2002. Mass start: 2002.

Medals:

Women's 5 km 
The 5 km event ran from 1964 to 1998 before being replaced by the 10 km event, which was being reintroduced after the 10 km had been discontinued following the 1988 Winter Olympics.

Classic style: 1964-1998.

Medals:

Women's 15 km 
This event ran from 1992 to 2002 and was replaced by a 15 km skiathlon (7.5 km classical + 7.5 km freestyle) for the 2006 Winter Olympics.

Classic style: 1992, 1998. Freestyle: 1994, 2002. Mass start: 2002.

Medals:

Statistics

Medal table

Cross-country skier medal leaders

Men

Women

* denotes all Olympics in which mentioned cross-country skiers took part. Boldface denotes latest Olympics.

Cross-country skiers with most victories

Top 10 cross-country skiers who won more gold medals at the Winter Olympics are listed below. Boldface denotes active cross-country skiers and highest medal count among all cross-country skiers (including these who not included in these tables) per type.

Men

Women

* denotes only those Olympics at which mentioned skiers won at least one medal

Medals per year

 bolded numbers indicate the highest medal count at that year's Olympic Games.

Medal sweep events
These are the podium sweeps; events in which athletes from one NOC won all three medals.

  In addition to sweeping the podium, the country also had the fourth-place finisher.

Multiple medals at one Olympic Games - men 

 5 medals:
  out of 6 possible: 
      2022 Alexander Bolshunov 
 4 medals:
  out of 4 possible: 
     1984 Gunde Svan  
     1956 Sixten Jernberg  
 out of 5 possible:
     1992 Vegard Ulvang  
     1992 Bjørn Dæhlie  
     1998 Bjørn Dæhlie  
     1994 Bjørn Dæhlie  
 out of 6 possible:
     2010 Petter Northug 
     2022 Johannes Høsflot Klæbo 
     2018 Alexander Bolshunov  
 3 medals:
 out of 3 possible: none
 out of 4 possible:
    1980 Nikolay Zimyatov  
    1964 Eero Mäntyranta  
    1964 Sixten Jernberg  
    1972 Vyacheslav Vedenin  
    1956 Veikko Hakulinen  
    1972 Pål Tyldum  
    1960 Veikko Hakulinen  
    1956 Pavel Kolchin  
    1980 Juha Mieto  
    1988 Vladimir Smirnov  
    1968 Eero Mäntyranta  
    1984 Aki Karvonen  

 2 medals out of 2 possible:
   1924 Thorleif Haug  (+  in Nordic Combined)
   1928 Johan Grøttumsbråten  (one Gold in Cross Country + one in Nordic Combined)
   1932 Veli Saarinen  
   1924 Johan Grøttumsbråten  (+  in Nordic Combined)

Multiple medals at one Olympic Games - women 

 5 medals:
 out of 5 possible:
      1992 Lyubov Yegorova 
      1988 Larisa Lazutina 
      1994 Manuela Di Centa 
      1992 Yelena Välbe 
 out of 6 possible:
      2010 Marit Bjørgen 
      2018 Marit Bjørgen  (one  shared)

 4 medals:
 out of 4 possible:
     1984 Marja-Liisa Kirvesniemi 
 out of 5 possible:
     1994 Lyubov Yegorova 
 out of 6 possible:
     2018 Charlotte Kalla 
     2018 Stina Nilsson  

 3 medals:
 out of 3 possible:
    1964 Klavdiya Boyarskikh 
    1972 Galina Kulakova 
    1968 Toini Gustafsson 
    1976 Raisa Smetanina 
    1976 Helena Takalo 
    1972 Marjatta Kajosmaa 
 out of 4 possible:
    1988 Tamara Tikhonova 
    1988 Marjo Matikainen 

 2 medals out of 2 possible:
   1956 Lyubov Kozyreva 
   1960 Maria Gusakova 
   1956 Radya Yeroshina 
   1960 Lyubov Baranova 
   1960 Radya Yeroshina 
   1956 Sonja Edström

See also 

 List of FIS Nordic World Ski Championships medalists in men's cross-country skiing
 List of FIS Nordic World Ski Championships medalists in women's cross-country skiing

References 
General
 
 1924 1928 1932 1936 1948 1952 1956 1960 1964 1968 1972 1976 1980 1984 1988 1992 1994 1998 2002 2006
 
 
 

Specific

External links 
 Cross Country Skiing – Olympics at Sports-reference.com
 Olympic Review and Revue Olympique. LA84 Foundation

Cross-country skiing
Medalists
 
Olympic medalists in cross-country skiing